The Fort Myers Tip-Off is a two-day college basketball tournament held in Fort Myers, Florida at Suncoast Credit Union Arena during Thanksgiving week. The tournament started in 2018.

Champions

* – Denotes overtime period

Brackets

2023
SMU
West Virginia
Wisconsin
Virginia

2022 
The tournament is set to take place from November 21–23, 2022.

2021 
Florida, Ohio State, Cal and Seton Hall made up the four-team field for the 2021 Rocket Mortgage Fort Myers Tip-Off. The event was once again staged at Suncoast Credit Union Arena on the campus of Florida SouthWestern State College during Thanksgiving week. On June 16, The Fort Myers Tip-Off announced that it will expand to eight teams with two divisions, Beach and Palms.

Beach

Palms

2020

2019

2018

References

External links
 Fort Myers Tip-Off

College men's basketball competitions in the United States
College basketball competitions
2018 establishments in Florida
Recurring sporting events established in 2018